Death Race is a 2008 dystopian action thriller film written and directed by Paul W. S. Anderson. It stars Jason Statham, Tyrese Gibson, Ian McShane, and Joan Allen.

Though referred to as a remake of the 1975 film Death Race 2000 (which in turn is based on Ib Melchior's short story "The Racer") in reviews and marketing materials, director Paul W. S. Anderson stated in the DVD commentary that he thought of the film as something of a prequel.

A remake had been in development since 2002, though production was delayed by disapproval of early screenplays, then placed in turnaround following a dispute between Paramount Pictures and the producer duo Tom Cruise and Paula Wagner (the latter was the producer without Cruise in the film). Death Race was acquired by Universal Pictures, and Anderson re-joined the project to write and direct. Filming began in Montreal in August 2007, and the completed project was released on August 22, 2008. The film received mixed reviews from critics and grossed $76 million worldwide.

Three direct-to-video films in the series were then released: Death Race 2 (2010), Death Race 3: Inferno (2013) and Death Race: Beyond Anarchy (2018).

Plot 
In 2012, the collapse of the US economy and the subsequent increase in crime rates leads to the rise of privatized prisons. One such prison is Terminal Island Penitentiary, whose warden, Claire Hennessey, earns profits from broadcasting "Death Race", a vehicular combat racing series, on the internet. Throughout the season, Terminal Island inmates battle each other in specially modified, weaponised and armoured cars on a track cut into the grounds, with the goal of winning their freedom.

Towards the end of a race, a masked driver nicknamed Frankenstein is nearing the finish line, pursued by his rival Machine Gun Joe. His navigator, Case, reports that all of his defensive weapons have malfunctioned. Against her protests, Frankenstein refuses to let Joe finish first. Case ejects herself out of the car just before Joe destroys it as it crosses the finish line.

Industrial worker and ex-con Jensen Ames struggles to support his family. When the steel mill he works at is closed, he returns home to his wife Suzy and their new-born daughter, Piper. A masked assailant knocks him unconscious. Jensen wakes up with a bloodied knife in his hand, Suzy dead nearby, and policemen storming into his home and arresting him. He is sentenced to life imprisonment, while Piper is placed in foster care.

Six months later, Jensen is transferred to Terminal Island Prison. Hennessey's second in-command Ulrich calls Jensen to her office. She tells him that Frankenstein had died from the injuries he received at the end of the previous race, and offers to let Jensen go free if he drives Frankenstein's car to win one more race. Jensen accepts the offer and meets Frankenstein's maintenance crew consisting of Coach, Gunner, and Lists; they explain to Jensen that Hennessey wants him to become Frankenstein to rebuild the profits and audience of "Death Race", which has halved since Frankenstein's "disappearance".

On the first day of the three day race, Jensen meets Case. During the race his vehicle's defensive equipment again mysteriously malfunctions. Jensen is distracted and blindsided by Joe when he sees Pachenko perform the same hand gesture at him as the masked assailant, causing Jensen to realize it was Pachenko who killed his wife. Jensen confronts Pachenko and attacks him after the race - prompting Pachenko to admit the truth: Hennessey ordered him to frame Jensen, so she can have a replacement for Frankenstein. On the second day, Jensen threatens to eject Case unless she explains the truth about the malfunctions. Case admits she sabotaged Frankenstein's car to keep him from winning and leaving Death Race, in exchange for her release papers. Jensen then tricks Pachenko into slamming his car head-on into a concrete barrier, and exits the car to snap Pachenko's neck. He and Joe then collaborate to destroy a multi-weapon tanker truck called the "Dreadnought", which was added to boost ratings, after the tanker massacres most of the surviving racers, much to the warden's fury. By the end of the second race day, all racers except Jensen and Joe are killed. Hennessey orders Ulrich to plant a bomb underneath Jensen's car in case he wins, knowing she can always find another person to impersonate Frankenstein. Jensen, who has realized Hennessey never intended to let anyone win their freedom from the start, approaches Joe after the race, suggesting they talk.

On the final race, Hennessey deliberately allows Joe to open fire on Jensen's car while rendering Jensen unable to retaliate. Jensen contacts Joe, suggesting they collaborate again, whereupon they destroy and drive through a weakened wall. Hennessey activates the bomb, but does not know it was removed and disassembled by Coach. She orders helicopters to pursue, but Jensen jumps out of the car as Case takes his place. Case is captured while Joe and Jensen escape on a freight train. Hennessey later opens a present sent due to record-breaking ratings, finding it to be the bomb she planted on Jensen's car. Coach detonates the bomb, killing Hennessey and Ulrich. He then turns to the audience and says "I love this game!" Six months later and 2000 miles away, Joe and Jensen, reunited with Piper, are shown working in Mexico as mechanics, and are soon reunited with Case.

Cast

Production
In March 2005, following the success of Alien vs. Predator (2004), director Paul W. S. Anderson revealed that he was directing a remake of Death Race 2000 (1975) entitled Death Race 3000 at Paramount Pictures based on a script by J. F. Lawton. The remake would be produced by the producer pair Tom Cruise and Paula Wagner. Anderson described the remake as a riff on the first film. "It's not a straight remake at all. The first movie was an across-America race. This will be an around-the-world race. And it's set further in the future, so the cars are even more futuristic. So you've got cars with rockets, machine guns, force fields; cars that can split apart and re-form, a bit like Transformers. Cars that become invisible," the director explained. Comingsoon.net reported that "Paul saw his film almost as a prequel if anything; almost the genesis of the Death Race", though the film is referred to primarily as a remake in reviews and marketing materials.

Two years later, Roger Corman, the producer of Death Race 2000, elaborated that he had an option agreement with producer Tom Cruise, and that Cruise would portray the lead role. The director said that Cruise had not been happy with the first two screenplays and that a third one was underway.  In June 2006, producer Jeremy Bolt reported that Anderson would direct the remake of Death Race 2000 after completing Resident Evil: Extinction (2007). The producer described the remake's new tone: "We've basically taken the idea of reality television and extended it twenty years. So it's definitely a comment on society, and particularly reality television, but it is not as much a parody or a satire as the original. It's more straight."  The following August, Paramount ended its relationship with Cruise/Wagner Productions, and Death Race was placed in turnaround. According to reports, when the project was discovered available, Universal Studios acquired it. Cruise and Wagner resumed their roles as producers, and Anderson returned to write and direct the film.

In April 2007, actor Jason Statham entered negotiations to star in Death Race, with production slated to begin in late summer or early fall.  Anderson described that Death Race would take place in a prison, and that the film would be "super-violent" like its predecessor. "It has little echoes of the original – a lot of people get run down, but rather than having the points system, which had no pay off anyway, it's a pure race. It's more like Gladiator, with the last person standing – or driving, winning," explained the director.  Filming on Death Race began in Montreal in August 2007.

Reception

Critical response
The film drew generally mixed reviews from critics. Review aggregator Rotten Tomatoes gives it a 42% rating based on reviews from 160 critics, with an average rating of 5.00/10. The website's critical consensus states, "Mindless, violent, and lightning-paced, Death Race is little more than an empty action romp." Metacritic reports a rating of 43 out of 100 based on reviews from 23 critics, indicating "mixed or average reviews". Audiences polled by CinemaScore during opening weekend gave the film an average grade of "B+" on a scale ranging from A+ to F.

Robert Koehler of Variety called Death Race "as hard as metal and just as dumb" and criticized it for removing the humor of Death Race 2000. Roger Ebert of the Chicago Sun-Times gave the film half a star (out of four), calling it "an assault on all the senses, including common." Keith Phipps of the A. V. Club said the film is "ideal for those who want to watch a bunch of cars blow each other up, without having to think about it all that much." Marc Savlov of the Austin Chronicle called Death Race "one of the most boring drags of all time."

Peter Hartlaub of the San Francisco Chronicle called the film "an ill-advised and severely wussified remake." Elizabeth Weitzman of the New York Daily News gave the film one and a half stars (out of four), calling it "junk", and saying that "the chases are pretty cool, but there's absolutely nothing else to see." A positive review came from Nathan Lee of The New York Times, who said that "the movie is legitimately greasy, authentically nasty, with a good old-fashioned sense of laying waste to everything in sight." James Berardinelli of ReelViews awarded Death Race a score of two and a half stars (out of four), saying that it's "weak when it comes to things like plot, character, and acting, but it's very good at provoking visceral reactions."

Box office
The film grossed $75,677,515, of which $36,316,032 was from North America.

Release 

The film was originally scheduled for release on September 26, 2008, but was moved to August 22, 2008.

Home media
The DVD and Blu-ray were released in the United States on December 21, 2008. There was also an unrated edition released. The Blu-ray version of the movie features a Digital Copy of the film. In the DVD commentary, Anderson further elaborates on his thought of the movie as a prequel more than a remake.

Music
The score to Death Race was composed by Paul Haslinger and conducted by Tim Davies. Haslinger recorded the string portion of his score with the Hollywood Studio Symphony at the Sony Scoring Stage.

The soundtrack was released on August 19, 2008.

Prequels and sequel

The film is followed by two direct-to-video prequel films Death Race 2 (2010) and Death Race 3: Inferno (2013); both take place before this film and were filmed in South Africa. The films were directed by Roel Reiné, and star Luke Goss, Tanit Phoenix, Danny Trejo and Ving Rhames all appeared in the prequels. Lists and 14K are the only returning characters and are portrayed by Frederick Koehler and Robin Shou, respectively. A fourth film is a direct-to-video sequel to the first film, titled Death Race: Beyond Anarchy (2018), also featuring Lists, making him the only character to appear and be played by the same actor in all four films.

References

External links
 
 
 
 
 

2008 films
2008 science fiction action films
2000s chase films
American science fiction action films
Remakes of American films
American road movies
British science fiction action films
British road movies
Death Race (franchise)
American dystopian films
Films set in 2012
Films shot in Montreal
German science fiction action films
English-language German films
Relativity Media films
Universal Pictures films
Films directed by Paul W. S. Anderson
Films produced by Paul W. S. Anderson
Films set in the future
Films set in the United States
Films set in Mexico
Films set in prison
Films set on islands
Cruise/Wagner Productions films
Films produced by Roger Corman
Films with screenplays by Paul W. S. Anderson
Films scored by Paul Haslinger
Reboot films
2000s English-language films
2000s American films
2000s British films
2000s German films